The 1987–88 Detroit Red Wings season was the Red Wings' 56th season, the franchise's 62nd.

Coached by Jacques Demers, the team compiled a record of 41-28-11 for 93 points, to finish first place in the Norris Division at the end of the regular season for the first time ever. The Red Wings were the only team in their division to have a winning record that season. In the playoffs, they won their Norris Division Semifinal series 4–2 over the Toronto Maple Leafs, and followed that with a 5 game win over the St. Louis Blues in the Norris Division Final. In the Campbell Conference Final, the Red Wings ran out of magic as they lost in five games to the eventual Stanley Cup champion Edmonton Oilers.

Offseason

Regular season

Final standings

Schedule and results

Playoffs
The Red Wings won the Norris Division title in 1987-88, their first division title since the 1964-65 season. They went up against the Toronto Maple Leafs in the Norris Division semifinals, and won the series in six games. They next faced the St. Louis Blues in the Norris Division Final and won in five games. The Red Wings then faced the Edmonton Oilers in the Campbell Conference Final for the second year in a row. Just like the year before, the Oilers beat the Red Wings in five games on their way to their 4th Stanley Cup championship in five years.

Player statistics

Regular season
Scoring

Goaltending

Playoffs
Scoring

Goaltending

Note: GP = Games played; G = Goals; A = Assists; Pts = Points; +/- = Plus-minus PIM = Penalty minutes; PPG = Power-play goals; SHG = Short-handed goals; GWG = Game-winning goals;
      MIN = Minutes played; W = Wins; L = Losses; T = Ties; GA = Goals against; GAA = Goals-against average;  SO = Shutouts; SA=Shots against; SV=Shots saved; SV% = Save percentage;

Awards and records

Transactions

Draft picks
Detroit's draft picks at the 1987 NHL Entry Draft held at the Joe Louis Arena in Detroit, Michigan.

Farm teams

See also
1987–88 NHL season

References

External links
 

Detroit
Detroit
Detroit Red Wings seasons
Norris Division champion seasons
Detroit Red
Detroit Red